Boujemaa Hilmann (born 1946) is a Moroccan boxer. He competed in the men's flyweight event at the 1968 Summer Olympics. At the 1968 Summer Olympics, he lost to Constantin Ciucă of Romania.

References

1946 births
Living people
Moroccan male boxers
Olympic boxers of Morocco
Boxers at the 1968 Summer Olympics
Sportspeople from Marrakesh
Mediterranean Games medalists in boxing
Flyweight boxers
Mediterranean Games gold medalists for Morocco
Competitors at the 1967 Mediterranean Games
21st-century Moroccan people
20th-century Moroccan people